Volodymyr Yuriyevich Yelchenko (born June 27, 1959 in Kyiv, in the Ukrainian SSR of the Soviet Union) is a Ukrainian diplomat. His latest post was the Ambassador of Ukraine to the United States. from December 2019 until February 2021. Previously to this appointment (as Ukrainian ambassador to the U.S), he was the Permanent Representative of Ukraine to the United Nations since December 9, 2015. and was formerly Ambassador of Ukraine to Russia from July 2010 until he was recalled for consultations in March 2014.

Biography 
Yelchenko was born in Kyiv in 1959, the son of the Minister of Culture (1971-1973) Yuriy Nykyforovych Yelchenko. Volodymyr graduated from the Faculty of International Relations and International Law at Kyiv State University in 1981.  Since 1981 he has worked in the diplomatic service of Ukraine.  Between 1997 and 2000 he acted as Permanent Representative of Ukraine to the United Nations in New York, USA. From December 2000 till his next post he served at various senior posts within the Foreign Ministry of Ukraine. In 2005 - 2006 he was Ukraine's Ambassador to Austria, in 2006 - 2010 Mr. Yelchenko served as Permanent Representative of Ukraine to the International Organisations in Vienna, Austria. From 2010 Volodymyr Yelchenko served as Ambassador of Ukraine to the Russian Federation.

On 17 March 2014, during the 2014 Crimean crisis, Yelchenko was recalled from Moscow for consultations in regards to the Crimean Crisis. Since then Ukraine's highest diplomatic representation in Russia is its temporary chargé d'affaires.

On December 9, 2015 Yelchenko was appointed Permanent Representative of Ukraine to the United Nations where he served until being appointed Ambassador of Ukraine to the United States on December 19, 2019.

On 25 February 2021 Ukrainian President Volodymyr Zelensky appointed Oksana Markarova Ambassador of Ukraine to the United States. By a decree of 25 February 2021, Zelensky dismissed Yelchenko from the post of ambassador to the United States, Antigua and Barbuda and Jamaica.

See also 
 Embassy of Ukraine in Moscow
 Embassy of Ukraine, Washington, D.C.
 Permanent Representative of Ukraine to the United Nations

References

External links

Living people
1959 births
Taras Shevchenko National University of Kyiv alumni
Diplomats from Kyiv
Ambassadors of Ukraine to Russia
Ambassadors of Ukraine to Austria
Permanent Representatives of Ukraine to the United Nations
Ambassadors of Ukraine to the United States
Ambassadors of Ukraine to Antigua and Barbuda
21st-century diplomats
20th-century diplomats